Karrur (also Romanized as Karrūr; also known as Karrū) is a village in Garmsar Rural District, Jebalbarez-e Jonubi District, Anbarabad County, Kerman Province, Iran.  At the 2006 census, its population was 54, in 14 families.

References 

Populated places in Anbarabad County